The Krunichev T-411 Aist (en: Stork) is a Russian light utility monoplane designed by the Russian company Aeroprogress and placed into production by the Khrunichev State Research and Production Space Center. A version is marketed in the United States as the Aeroprogress T-411 Wolverine powered by a Continental TSIO-550-B.

A homebuilt derivative design is the Washington T-411 Wolverine.

Development
The ROKS-Aero corporation was set up in Moscow in 1990 to design and manufacture general aviation aircraft, but was renamed Aeroprogress in 1993. In 1992 ROKS-Aero started design of a single-engined light aircraft, the T-411 Aist 2. Construction of the prototype T-411 started in April 1993, making its maiden flight on 10 November 1993. The Khrunichev State Research and Production Space Center set up an aviation department in 1994 and purchased a license to build the Aist. The airframe, however, is produced by Production complex #2 of RAC MIG. It is a high-wing braced monoplane with a tubular-steel fuselage and metal fabric covered wings.   The T-411 is powered by a 360 hp Vedeneyev M14P radial piston engine and has either a fixed tail wheel landing gear or can be fitted with floats.

Specifications

See also

References

Notes

Bibliography

External links
RAC MIG page on Aist

T-411
1990s Soviet and Russian civil utility aircraft
High-wing aircraft
Single-engined tractor aircraft
Floatplanes
Aircraft first flown in 1993